Coal phase-out is an environmental policy intended to stop using the combustion of coal in coal-burning power plants, and is part of fossil fuel phase-out. Coal is the most carbon-intensive fossil fuel, therefore phasing it out is critical to limiting climate change and keeping global warming to 1.5 °C as laid out in the Paris Climate Agreement. The International Energy Agency (IEA) estimates that coal is responsible for over 30% of the global average temperature increase above pre-industrial levels.

China is the major provider of public finance for coal projects.  Several countries and financial institutions have taken initiatives to phase out coal out such as ending funding for building coal plants. The health and environmental benefits of coal phase-out, such as limiting biodiversity loss and respiratory diseases, are greater than the cost. It has been suggested that developed countries could finance the process for developing countries provided they do not build any more coal plants and do a just transition. One major intergovernmental organisation (the G7) committed in 2021 to end support for coal-fired power stations within the year. It has been estimated that coal phase-out could benefit society by over 1% of GDP each year to the end of the 21st century, so economists have suggested a Coasean bargain in which developed countries help finance the coal phase-out of developing countries.

Peak coal 

Global coal consumption peaked in 2013, and had dropped slightly by the end of the 2010s. The decline in coal use is largely driven by consumption declines in the United States and Europe, as well as developed economies in Asia. In 2019, production increases in countries such as China, Indonesia, India, Russia and Australia compensated for the falls in the United States and Europe. However, coal's structural decline continued in the 2020s.

Coal phase-out by country

Africa

South Africa 

As of 2007, South Africa's power sector is the 8th highest global emitter of CO2. In 2005/2006, 77% of South Africa's energy demand was directly met by coal, and when current projects come online, this ratio will increase in the near term.

There are no plans to phase out coal-fired power plants in South Africa, and indeed, the country is investing in building massive amounts of new coal-fired capacity to meet power demands, as well as modernizing the existing coal-fired plants to meet environmental requirements.

On 6 April 2010, the World Bank approved a $3.75B loan to South Africa to support the construction of the world's 4th largest coal-fired plant, at Medupi.
The proposed World Bank loan includes a relatively small amount $260 million for wind and solar power.

Rated at 4800 MW, Medupi Power Station would join other mammoth coal-fired power plants already in operation in the country, namely Kendal Power Station (4100 MW), Majuba Power Station (4100 MW), and Matimba Power Station (4000 MW), as well as a similar-capacity Kusile Power Station, at 4800 MW, currently under construction.  Kusile is expected to come online in stages, starting in 2012, while Medupi is expected to first come online in 2013, with full capacity available by 2017.  These schedules are provisional, and may change.

Since 2008, South Africa's government started funding solar water heating installations. As of January 2016, there have been 400 000 domestic installations in total, with free-of-charge installation of low-pressure solar water heaters for low-cost homes or low-income households which have access to the electricity grid, while other installations are subsidised.

Americas

Canada 

In 2005, Canada annually burned 60 million tonnes of coal, mainly for electrical power, increasing by 15 percent annually. In November 2016, the Government of Canada announced plans to phase out coal-fired electricity generation by 2030. , only four provinces burn coal to generate electricity: Alberta, Nova Scotia, New Brunswick, and Saskatchewan. Canada aims to generate 90% of its electricity from non-emitting sources by 2030. Already, it generates 82% from non-emitting sources.

Beginning in 2005, Ontario planned coal phase-out legislation as a part of the province's electricity policy. The province annually consumed 15 million tonnes of coal in large power plants to supplement nuclear power. Nanticoke Generating Station was a major source of air pollution, and Ontario suffered "smog days" during the summer. In 2007, Ontario's Liberal government committed to phasing out all coal generation in the province by 2014. Premier Dalton McGuinty said, "By 2030 there will be about 1,000 more new coal-fired generating stations built on this planet. There is only one place in the world that is phasing out coal-fired generation and we're doing that right here in Ontario." The Ontario Power Authority projected that in 2014, with no coal generation, the largest sources of electrical power in the province will be nuclear (57 percent), hydroelectricity (25 percent), and natural gas (11 percent). In April 2014, Ontario was the first jurisdiction in North America to eliminate coal in electricity generation. The final coal plant in Ontario, Thunder Bay Generating Station, stopped burning coal in April 2014.

United States 

In 2017, fossil fuels provided 81 percent of the energy consumed in the United States, down from 86 percent in 2000.

In 2007, 154 new coal-fired plants were on the drawing board in 42 states. By 2012, that had dropped to 15, mostly due to new rules limiting mercury emissions, and limiting carbon emissions to 1,000 pounds of CO2 per megawatt-hour of electricity produced.

In July 2013, US Secretary of Energy Ernest Moniz outlined Obama administration policy on fossil fuels:

Then-US Energy Secretary Steven Chu and researchers for the US National Renewable Energy Laboratory have noted that greater electrical generation by non-dispatchable renewables, such as wind and solar, will also increase the need for flexible natural gas-powered generators, to supply electricity during those times when solar and wind power are unavailable. Gas-powered generators have the ability to ramp up and down quickly to meet changing loads.

In the US, many of the fossil fuel phase-out initiatives have taken place at the state or local levels.

In November 2021, US refused to sign up to coal phaseout agreement at the COP26 climate summit.

California 
California's SB 1368 created the first governmental moratorium on new coal plants in the United States. The law was signed in September 2006 by Republican Governor Arnold Schwarzenegger, took effect for investor-owned utilities in January 2007, and took effect for publicly owned utilities in August 2007. SB 1368 applied to long-term investments (five years or more) by California utilities, whether in-state or out-of-state. It set the standard for greenhouse gas emissions at 1,100 pounds of carbon dioxide per megawatt-hour, equal to the emissions of a combined-cycle natural gas plant. This standard created a de facto moratorium on new coal, since it could not be met without carbon capture and sequestration.

Maine 
On 15 April 2008, Maine Governor John E. Baldacci signed LD 2126, "An Act To Minimize Carbon Dioxide Emissions from New Coal-Powered Industrial and Electrical Generating Facilities in the State." The law, which was sponsored by Rep. W. Bruce MacDonald (D-Boothbay), requires the Board of Environmental Protection to develop greenhouse gas emission standards for coal gasification facilities. It also puts a moratorium in place on building any new coal gasification facilities until the standards are developed.

Oregon 
In early March 2016, Oregon lawmakers approved a plan to stop paying for out-of-state coal plants by 2030 and require a 50 percent renewable energy standard by 2040. Environmental groups such as the American Wind Energy Association and leading Democrats praised the bill.

Texas 
In 2006, a coalition of Texas groups organized a campaign in favor of a statewide moratorium on new coal-fired power plants. The campaign culminated in a "Stop the Coal Rush" mobilization, including rallying and lobbying, at the state capital in  Austin on 11 and 12 February 2007. Over 40 citizen groups supported the mobilization.

In January 2007, a resolution calling for a 180-day moratorium on new pulverized coal plants was filed in the Texas Legislature by State Rep. Charles "Doc" Anderson (R-Waco) as House Concurrent Resolution 43. The resolution was left pending in committee. On 4 December 2007, Rep. Anderson announced his support for two proposed  integrated gasification combined cycle (IGCC) coal plants proposed by Luminant (formerly TXU).

Washington state 
Washington has followed the same approach as California, prohibiting coal plants whose emissions would exceed those of natural gas plants. Substitute Senate Bill 6001 (SSB 6001), signed on 3 May 2007, by Governor Christine Gregoire, enacted the standard. As a result of SSB 6001, the Pacific Mountain Energy Center in Kalama was rejected by the state. However, a new plant proposal, the Wallula Energy Resource Center, shows the limits of the "natural gas equivalency" approach as a means of prohibiting new coal plants. The proposed plant would meet the standard set by SSB 6001 by capturing and sequestering a portion (65 percent, according to a plant spokesman) of its carbon.

Hawaii 
Hawaii officially banned the use of coal September 12, 2020 when Governor Ige enacted Act 23 (SB2629). The law prohibited the issuing or renewing permits for coal power plants after December 31, 2022, and prohibited the extension of the power purchase agreement between AES and Hawaiian Electric. The power purchase agreement for the last coal plant, located on Oahu, expired September 1, 2022, this became the effective retirement date for the coal plant. On September 1, 2022, Hawaii will be completely coal free with the coal plant's retirement. Hawaii will transition to renewable energy to replace the energy produced by coal. The projects slated to replace the coal plant include nine solar plus battery projects, as well as a standalone battery storage project.

Utility action in the US 
 Progress Energy Carolinas announced on 1 June 2007, that it was beginning a two-year moratorium on proposals for new coal-fired power plants while it undertook more aggressive efficiency and conservation programs. The company added, "Additional reductions in future electricity demand growth through energy efficiency could push the need for new power plants farther into the future."
 Public Service of Colorado concluded in its November 2007 Resource Plan: "In sum, in light of the now likely regulation of CO2 emissions in the future due to broader interest in climate change issues, the increased costs of constructing new coal facilities, and the increased risk of timely permitting to meet planned in-service dates, Public Service does not believe it would not be prudent to consider at this time any proposals for new coal plants that do not include CO2 capture and sequestration.
 Xcel Energy noted in its 2007 Resource Plan that "given the likelihood of future carbon regulation, we have only modeled a future coal-based resource option that includes carbon capture and storage."
 Minnesota Power Company announced in December 2007 that it would not consider a new coal resource without a carbon solution.
 Avista Utilities announced that it does not anticipate pursuing coal-fired power plants in the foreseeable future.
 NorthWestern Energy announced on 17 December 2007, that it planned to double its wind power capacity over the next seven years and steer away from new baseload coal plants. The plans are detailed in the company's 2007 Montana Electric Supply Resource Plan.
 California Energy Commission (CEC) has initiated its review of two 53.4-megawatt solar thermal power plants that will each include a 40-megawatt biomass power plant to supplement the solar power.

Asia

China 

As of 2020, over half of the world's coal-generated electricity was produced in China.  In 2020 alone, China added 38 gigawatts of coal-fired power generation, over three times what the rest of the world built that year.

China is confident of achieving a rich zero carbon economy by 2050. In 2021, the government ordered all coal mines to operate at full capacity at all times, including holidays; approved new mines, and eliminated restrictions on coal imports.  In November 2021, China reached record coal production levels, breaking the previous historic record, established in October 2021.

China's exceedingly high energy demand has pushed the demand for relatively cheap coal-fired power. Serious air quality deterioration has resulted from the massive use of coal and many Chinese cities suffer severe smog events. 

As a consequence the region of Beijing has decided to phase out all its coal-fired power generation by the end of 2015. 

In 2009, China had 172 GW of installed hydro capacity, the largest in the world, producing 16% of China's electricity, the Eleventh Five-Year Plan has set a 300 GW target for 2020. China built the world's largest power plant of any kind, the Three Gorges Dam.

In addition to the huge investments in coal power, China has 32 nuclear reactors under construction, the highest number in the world.

Analysis in 2016, showed that China's coal consumption appears to have peaked in 2014.  In 2014, China consumed 2050 MTOE of coal; in 2020, 2060 MTOE; and the IEA projected 2021 China coal consumption at 2150 MTOE, or an increase of 5% vs. 2014.

India 

India is the third largest consumer of coal in the world. India's federal energy minister is planning to stop importing thermal coal by 2018.
The annual report of India's Power Ministry has a plan to grow power by about 80 GW as part of their 11th 5-year plan, and 79% of that growth will be in fossil fuel–fired power plants, primarily coal.  India plans four new "ultra mega" coal-fired power plants as part of that growth, each 4000 MW in capacity. , there are six nuclear reactors under construction. In the first half of 2016, the amount of coal-fired generating capacity in pre-construction planning in India fell by 40,000 MW, according to results released by the Global Coal Plant Tracker. In June 2016, India's Ministry of Power stated that no further power plants would be required in the next three years, and "any thermal power plant that has yet to begin construction should back off."

In cement production, carbon neutral biomass is being used to replace coal for reducing carbon foot print drastically.

Japan 

Japan, the world's third-largest economy, made a major move to use more fossil fuels in 2012, when the nation shut down nuclear reactors following the Fukushima accident. Nuclear, which had supplied 30 percent of Japanese electricity from 1987 to 2011, supplied only 2 percent in 2012 (hydropower supplied 8 percent). Nuclear electricity was replaced with electricity from petroleum, coal, and liquified natural gas. As a result, electricity generation from fossil fuels rose to 90 percent in 2012.  By 2021, Japan generated 30% of its electricity from coal.

In January 2017, the Japanese government announced plans to build 45 new coal-fired power plants in the next ten years, largely to replace expensive electricity from petroleum power plants. Japan has 140 coal plants of which 114 are classified as inefficient and as a result the government intends to shut these down by 2050 to meet its climate commitments.

Europe 

In July 2014, CAN Europe, WWF European Policy Office, HEAL, EEB and Climate-Alliance Germany published a report calling for the decommissioning of the thirty most polluting coal-fired power plants in Europe.

Austria 
Austria closed its last coal power plant in 2020.

Belgium 
After the government denied a 2009 application to build a new power plant in Antwerp, the Langerlo power station burned its last ton of coal in March 2016, ending the use of coal fired power plants in Belgium.

Denmark 
As part of their Climate Policy Plan, Denmark stated that it will phase out oil for heating purposes and coal by 2030. Additionally, their goal is to supply 100% of their electricity and heating needs with renewable energy five years later (i.e. 2035).

Finland 
In 2019, Finland enacted a ban of coal use for energy purposes starting on 1 May 2029, ahead of the 2030 schedule discussed earlier. As of 2020, coal represented only 4.4% of electricity generated in the country. Finland is a founding member of the Powering Past Coal Alliance along 18 other countries.

France 

The French government intends to close or convert the nation's last four coal plants by 2022. In April 2021 the Le Havre coal plant unit was shuttered.

In December 2017, to fight against global warming, France adopted a law banning new fossil fuel exploitation projects and closing current ones by 2040 in all of its territories. France thus became the first country to programme the end of fossil fuel exploitation.

Germany 

Hard coal mining has long been subsidized in Germany, reaching a peak of €6.7billion in 1996 and dropping to €2.7billion in 2005 due to falling output.  These subsidies represented a burden on public finances and implied a substantial opportunity cost, diverting funds away from other, more beneficial public investments.

In February 2007, Germany announced plans to phase out hard coal-industry subsidies by 2018, a move which ended hard coal mining in Germany. This exit was later than the EU-mandated end by 2014. Solar and wind are major sources of energy and renewable energy generation, around 15% as of December 2013, and growing. 

In 2007, German Chancellor Angela Merkel and the First Merkel cabinet (CDU/CSU and SPD) agreed to legislation to phase out Germany's hard coal mining sector. That did not mean that they supported phasing out coal in general. There were plans to build about 25 new plants in the coming years. Most German coal power plants were built in the 1960s, and have a low energy efficiency. Public sentiment against coal power plants was growing and the construction or planning of some plants was stopped. A number are under construction and still being built. No concrete plan is in place to reduce coal-fired electricity generation. As of October 2015, the remaining coal plants still under planning include: Niederaussem, Profen, and Stade. The coal plants then under construction included: Mannheim and Kraftwerk Datteln IV (it started 30 May 2020). Between 2012 and 2015, six new plants went online. 
All of these plants are 600–1800  MWe.

In 2014, Germany's coal consumption dropped for the first time, having risen each year since the low during the 2009 recession.

A 2014 study found that coal is not making a comeback in Germany, as is sometimes claimed.  Rather renewables have more than offset the nuclear facilities that have been shut down as a result of Germany's nuclear phase-out (Atomausstieg).  Hard coal plants now face financial stringency as their operating hours are cut back by the market.  But in contrast, lignite-fired generation is in a safe position until the  unless government policies change.  To phase-out coal, Germany should seek to strength the emissions trading system (EU-ETS), consider a carbon tax, promote energy efficiency, and strengthen the use of natural gas as a bridge fuel.

In 2016, the Third Merkel cabinet and affected lignite power plant operators , RWE, and Vattenfall reached an understanding (Verständigung) on the transfer of lignite power plant units into security standby (Überführung von Braunkohlekraftwerksblöcken in die Sicherheitsbereitschaft).  As a result, eight lignite-fired power plants are to be mothballed and later closed, with the first plant scheduled to cease operation in October 2016 and the last in October 2019.  The affected operators will receive state compensation for foregone profits.  The European Commission has declared government plans to use €1.6billion of public financing for this purpose to be in line with EU state aid rules.

A 2016 study found that the phase-out of lignite in Lusatia (Lausitz) by 2030 can be financed by future owner EPH in a manner that avoids taxpayer involvement.  Instead, liabilities covering decommissioning and land rehabilitation could be paid by EPH directly into a foundation, perhaps run by the public company LMBV.  The study calculates the necessary provisions at €2.6billion.

In November 2016, the German utility STEAG announced it will be decommissioning five coal-fired generating units in North Rhine-Westphalia and Saarland due to low wholesale electricity prices.

A coal phase-out for Germany is implied in Germany's Climate Action Plan 2050, environment minister Barbara Hendricks said in an interview on 21November 2016.  "If you read the Climate Action Plan carefully, you will find that the exit from coal-fired power generation is the immanent consequence of the energy sector target.... By 2030... half of the coal-fired power production must have ended, compared to 2014", she said.

Plans to cut down the ancient Hambach Forest to extend the Hambach open pit mine in 2018 have resulted in massive protests. On 5 October 2018 a German court ruled against the further destruction of the forest for mining purposes. The ruling states, the court needs more time to reconsider the complaint. Angela Merkel, the chancellor of Germany, welcomed the court's ruling. The forest is located approximately 29 km west of the city center of Cologne (specifically Cologne Cathedral).

In January 2019 the German Commission on Growth, Structural Change and Employment initiated Germany's plans to entirely phase out and shut down the 84 remaining coal-fired plants on its territory by 2038.

In May 2020 Germany commissioned the 1100 megawatt Datteln 4 coal-fired power plant after nearly a 10-year delay in construction.

In the first half of 2021, coal was the largest source of power generation in Germany due to less wind than in the years before.

As coal is continuously phased-out in Germany, natural gas is increasingly replacing coal-burning power plants. In late 2021, a record-breaking surge in energy prices in Europe, particularly for natural gas and refined petroleum products, has put this development into question. While the European Union is gradually cutting down on its dependence on fossil fuels, a shift to a green economy has not happened as swiftly as expected. Since many countries in Europe resort to natural gas in order to build their green economies, elevated prices for natural gas have been viewed as a stumbling block for reducing greenhouse gas emissions.

Italy 
As of 2020, Italy has still 9 coal power plant, for a total capacity of 7702 MW. Enel,  Italy's largest power generator, intends to shut down 3 power plants in early 2021.

Netherlands 

On 22 September 2016, the Dutch parliament voted for a 55% cut in  emissions by 2030, a move which would require the closure of the country's five coal-fired power plants.  The vote is not binding on the government however. In December 2019 the Dutch senate banned coal for power generation by 2030 at the latest.

Portugal 
On 20 November 2021 Portugal turned off the last remaining coal station (Pego), making Portugal coal free.

Spain 
In October 2018, the Sánchez government and Spanish Labour unions settled an agreement to close ten Spanish coal mines at the end of 2018. The government pre-engaged to spend 250 million Euro to pay for early retirements, occupational retraining and structural change. In 2018, about 2.3 percent of the electric energy produced in Spain was produced in coal-burning power plants.

Sweden 
In 2019 coal was still used to a limited extent to fuel three co-generation plants in Sweden that produced electricity and district heating. The operators of these plants planned to phase out coal by 2020, 2022 and 2025 respectively. In August 2019 one of the three remaining coal burning power producers announced that they had phased out coal prematurely in 2019 instead of 2020. Värtaverket was scheduled to close in 2022, but closed in 2020. This was the last coal plant in Sweden, and its closure made Sweden coal free.

In addition to heat and power coal is also used for steel production, there are long-term plans to phase out coal from steel production: Sweden is constructing hydrogen-based pilot steel plant to replace coke and coal usage in steel production. Once this technology is commercialized with the hydrogen generated from renewable energy sources (biogas or electricity), the carbon foot print of steel production would reduce drastically.

United Kingdom 
Remaining coal-fired power stations will be closed by 2024 or earlier. This will not be a complete phase-out of fossil fuels because gas-fired power stations will continue to provide some firm power.

Scotland's last coal power station closed in 2016 and Wales' last coal power station closed in December 2019.

Coal power in England has also reduced substantially.  In generating capability there has been the closure of the Hinton Heavies, and closure or conversion to biomass of the remaining coal plants will be completed by 2024. In terms of actual production, in 2018 it was less than at any time since the industrial revolution. The first "coal free day" took place in 2017. Coal supplied 5.4% of UK electricity in 2018, down from 30% in 2014, and 70% in 1990.

Oceania

Australia 
 The Australian Greens party have proposed to phase out coal power stations. The NSW Greens proposed an immediate moratorium on coal-fired power stations and want to end all coal mining and coal industry subsidies.  The Australian Greens and the Australian Labor Party also oppose nuclear power.  The Federal Government and Victorian State Government want to modify existing coal-fired power stations into clean coal power stations. The Federal Labor government extended the mandatory renewable energy targets, an initiative to ensure that new sources of electricity are more likely to be from wind power, solar power and other sources of renewable energy in Australia.  Australia is one of the largest consumers of coal per capita, and also the largest exporter. The proposals are strongly opposed by industry, unions and the main Opposition Party in Parliament (now forming the party in government after the September 2013 election).

New Zealand 

In October 2007, the Clark Labour government introduced a 10year moratorium on new fossil fuel thermal power generation.  The ban was limited to state-owned utilities, although an extension to the private sector was considered.  The new government under MP John Key (NZNP) elected in November 2008 repealed this legislation.

In 2014, almost 80 percent of the electricity produced in New Zealand was from sustainable energy. 
On 6 August 2015, Genesis Energy Limited announced that it would close its two last coal-fired power stations.

See also
 Beyond Coal a campaign by the Sierra Club to promote renewable energy instead of coal
 Big Coal: The Dirty Secret Behind America's Energy Future
 Burning the Future: Coal in America
 The Coal Question
Powering Past Coal Alliance

References

Coal phase-out
Emissions reduction
Energy policy
Technological phase-outs